"Punkrocker" is a song written and originally performed by the Swedish electronic/alternative group Teddybears. The song first appeared on their 2000 album Rock’n’Roll Highschool, and was covered later that year by Caesar's Palace (later known as Caesars), a band which also includes Teddybears member Joakim Åhlund.

The song has been covered multiple times, with the best known version of the song internationally being a 2006 re-recording by Teddybears with featured American singer Iggy Pop on lead vocals. This version of the song was a minor hit in the United States, and appeared in a Cadillac ad campaign in 2007.

Notable covers

It has been performed by
 Caesar's Palace on the album Cherry Kicks (2000)
 Teddybears STHLM on the album Rock’n’Roll Highschool (2000)
 Thomas Rusiak featuring Teddybears STHLM as "Hiphopper" on the album Magic Villa (2000) Though not a hip hop song itself, the song is a parody of the hip hop culture.
 Slagsmålsklubben as "Synthpopper" on the album Fest i valen - Edition (2001)
 Torgny Melins (a Swedish dansband) as "Dansbander" on the album Dansbander (2006) also releasing it as a single the same year.
 Teddybears featuring Iggy Pop on the album Soft Machine (2006).
 Träd, Gräs och Stenar live since 2002 and on the album Homeless Cats (2009).
  The Swedish radio show Rally as "Jag är Hiphop-Yngve, jojomen" (2000).
 Snutjävel (a Swedish punkband) as "Punksvin" CDS (2010)
Crazy & the Brains on the single Punk Rocker (2021).

In the media 
The Teddybears' single, "Punkrocker" (featuring Iggy Pop), is featured in a Cadillac television commercial directed by Daniel Askill, titled 'Roll' and features a time-line of Cadillac automobiles, from the original 1902 Cadillac to the 2007 Cadillac XLR sports convertible. The song also appeared in the background of a scene of NBC's Bionic Woman.

Thomas Rusiak's version "Hiphopper" can be heard in Kevin Smith's 2001 film Jay and Silent Bob Strike Back.

Music video 
The music video portrays parts of New York's skyline at nighttime. Everyone's (except Iggy Pop who is seen in a car) head is replaced with a bear (so is the Statue of Liberty seen at the end.)

References 

Teddybears (band) songs
Iggy Pop songs
Songs written by Klas Åhlund
2006 songs
Songs written by Joakim Åhlund